Tubuca rosea, also known by its common name rose fiddler crab, is a species of crab from the genus Tubuca.

References

Crabs